Lost River begins and ends in a closed basin in northern California and southern Oregon in the United States.

From its source, the river flows into Langell Valley, where Miller Creek enters from the right. The river then turns southeast and flows along the base of Stukel Mountain, where it provides diversion canals for small lakes including Nuss Lake for irrigation and flood control. It then re-enters California south of Merrill.

Dams, canals, pumps, and other artificial structures on the Lost River, Clear Lake, and Tule Lake are part of the Klamath Project of the U.S. Bureau of Reclamation, which manages the basin's water flow mainly for farming and flood control. The  channel can also supply water by reverse flow from the Klamath when irrigation water is needed for farms in drained parts of Tule Lake.

After 1846, the Applegate Trail crossed the river on a natural bridge of stepping-stones, later covered by a Bureau of Reclamation dam, near Merrill. Earlier in that year, explorer John C. Frémont had named the stream McCrady River after a boyhood friend, but over time the Lost River name prevailed. A Lost River post office operated briefly, probably in the vicinity of Olene, Oregon, in 1875–76.

Trout are uncommon in this river.

See also
Battle of Lost River
List of longest streams of Oregon
List of rivers of California
List of rivers of Oregon

References

Rivers of Modoc County, California
Rivers of Oregon
Tributaries of the Klamath River
Rivers of Klamath County, Oregon
Modoc Plateau
Modoc National Forest
Rivers of Northern California